I Marinella tou simera… Se tragoudia tou Giorgou Hatzinasiou (Greek: Η Μαρινέλλα του σήμερα… Σε τραγούδια του Γιώργου Χατζηνάσιου) is the name of a studio album by popular Greek singer Marinella. It was released on 5 April 1978 by PolyGram Records in Greece and it went platinum, selling over 100,000 units.

The album is entirely composed by Giorgos Hatzinasios, with lyrics by Michalis Bourboulis, Manos Eleftheriou, Manos Koufianakis, Nikos Vrettos, Sofia Papadopoulou and Mimis Theiopoulos. The original release was in stereo on vinyl and cassette. This album was re-issued on CD in January 1993 by PolyGram.

Track listing 
Side One.
 "Na pezi to tranzistor" (Να παίζει το τρανζίστορ; The transistor radio plays) – (Lyrics by Michalis Bourboulis) – 2:47
 "Echis liga chronia, echis" (Έχεις λίγα χρόνια, έχεις; You only have a few years left) – (Lyrics by Michalis Bourboulis) – 3:11
 "Pedi ap' tin Anavysso" (Παιδί απ' την Ανάβυσσο; The boy from Anavyssos) – (Lyrics by Michalis Bourboulis) – 2:33
 "Sin Eftichia Papagiannopoulou" (Στην Ευτυχία Παπαγιαννοπούλου; Dedicated to Eftichia Papagianopoulos) – (Lyrics by Manos Eleftheriou) – 3:06
 "Egin' o kosmos kafenes" (Έγιν' ο κόσμος καφενές; The world became a coffee shop) – (Lyrics by Manos Eleftheriou) – 2:22
 "I treli" (Οι τρελοί; The crazy ones) – (Lyrics by Manos Eleftheriou) – 2:17
Side Two.
 "Den ine pou fevgis" (Δεν είναι που φεύγεις; It isn't you're leaving) – (Lyrics by Michalis Koufianakis) – 2:49
 "Simera" - (Σήμερα; Today) – (Lyrics by Mimis Theiopoulos) – 3:02
 "Tak, tik tak" (Τακ, τικ τακ; Tack, tick tack) – (Lyrics by Sofia Papadopoulou) – 3:12
 "S' efcharisto" (Σ' ευχαριστώ; I thank you) – (Lyrics by Sofia Papadopoulou) – 3:27
 "Den fteme emis" (Δεν φταίμε εμείς; It's not our fault) – (Lyrics by Nikos Vrettos) – 3:44

Personnel 
 Marinella - vocals, background vocals
 Philippos Papatheodorou - producer 
 Giorgos Hatzinasios - arranger, conductor
 Yiannis Smyrneos - recording engineer
 Alinta Mavrogeni - photographer

References

1978 albums
Greek-language albums
Marinella albums
Universal Music Greece albums